The 2018 Eastern Michigan Eagles football team represented Eastern Michigan University in the 2018 NCAA Division I FBS football season. They were led by fifth-year head coach Chris Creighton and played their home games at Rynearson Stadium in Ypsilanti, Michigan as members of the West Division of the Mid-American Conference. They finished the season 7–6, 5–3 in MAC play to finish in a three-way tie for second place in the West Division. They were invited to the Camellia Bowl where they lost to Georgia Southern.

Previous season
The Eagles finished the 2017 season 5–7, 3–5 in MAC play to finish in fifth place in the West Division.

Preseason

Award watch lists
Listed in the order that they were released

Preseason media poll
The MAC released their preseason media poll on July 24, 2018, with the Eagles predicted to finish in fourth place in the West Division.

Schedule

Game summaries

Monmouth

at Purdue

at Buffalo

at San Diego State

Northern Illinois

at Western Michigan

Toledo

at Ball State

Army

Central Michigan

Akron

at Kent State

vs. Georgia Southern (Camellia Bowl)

Roster

Players drafted into the NFL

References

Eastern Michigan
Eastern Michigan Eagles football seasons
Eastern Michigan Eagles football